John Wick: Chapter 3 – Parabellum (or simply John Wick: Chapter 3) is a 2019 American neo-noir action thriller film directed by Chad Stahelski, written by Derek Kolstad, Shay Hatten, Chris Collins, and Marc Abrams, based on a story by Kolstad, and starring Keanu Reeves as the title character, alongside an ensemble supporting cast including Halle Berry, Laurence Fishburne, Mark Dacascos, Asia Kate Dillon, Lance Reddick, Anjelica Huston, and Ian McShane. The film, the sequel to John Wick: Chapter 2 (2017) and the third installment in the John Wick franchise, centers on John Wick going on the run from a legion of hitmen after a bounty is placed for his murder.

In October 2016, Stahelski stated a third John Wick film was in the works; this was formally announced in June 2017, after the returns of Reeves and Kolstad were confirmed, followed by Stahelski's return in January 2018. Much of the returning cast and crew was confirmed that following month, with new members joining that May. Principal photography began that month and lasted through that November, with filming locations including New York City and Casablanca.

John Wick: Chapter 3 – Parabellum had its premiere at the Regal Union Square in New York City on May 9, 2019, and was released in the United States on May 17, by Lionsgate. It received generally positive reviews from critics, with praise for the action sequences, visual style, and Reeves's performance. The film grossed over $327 million worldwide, and took just 10 days to become the highest-grossing film in the franchise. A sequel, John Wick: Chapter 4, will be released in March 2023, with a spin-off film, Ballerina, set to be released in the future.

Plot

John Wick is making his way through Manhattan before he is labeled "excommunicado" for the unauthorized killing of High Table crime lord Santino D'Antonio. At the New York Public Library, John retrieves a marker medallion and a rosary. He is injured in a fight with another hitman, Ernest, and seeks medical treatment from an underworld doctor. His excommunicado status activates before the doctor can finish, forcing John to complete the suturing himself. Upon leaving, he is quickly pursued by various gangs of assassins, all of whom he kills.

John meets with The Director, the head of the Ruska Roma crime syndicate, where he presents the rosary and demands safe passage to Casablanca. As John was once a member, the Director reluctantly agrees. Meanwhile, a High Table Adjudicator meets with New York Continental manager Winston and the Bowery King, notifying them that they both have seven days to resign from their positions for helping John. The Adjudicator enlists Zero, a Japanese assassin, and orders him to stab The Director through both of her hands as penance for aiding John. In Casablanca, John meets Sofia, a former friend and manager of the Moroccan Continental.

John presents the medallion, which binds Sofia to return a debt, and demands to be directed to The Elder, the only person above the High Table. Sofia begrudgingly takes John to Berrada, her former boss, who tells John he may find The Elder by wandering through the desert until he can no longer walk. When Sofia refuses to give Berrada one of her trained Belgian Malinois, he shoots the dog but hits its bulletproof vest. John prevents Sofia from killing Berrada. They fight their way out of the kasbah and drive into the desert, where she leaves John. Seven days later, The Adjudicator and Zero confront the Bowery King, who refuses to abdicate his position. In response, Zero's students slaughter his men while the Bowery King is slashed seven times with a wakizashi. Meanwhile, John collapses in the desert and is brought to The Elder. John states that he wants to live to keep the memory of the love he once had with his late wife. The Elder agrees to forgive John if he kills Winston and remains subservient to the High Table for the remainder of his life. To show his fealty, John severs his ring finger and gives his wedding ring to The Elder.

John returns to New York and is attacked by Zero and his students before reaching the protection of the Continental. The Adjudicator arrives, but Winston refuses to abdicate, and John refuses to kill him, leading The Adjudicator to revoke the Continental's neutral status and send both Zero and an army of heavily armed High Table enforcers to kill John and Winston. Winston provides John with weapons and the assistance of concierge Charon and his staff. After killing all the enforcers, John is ambushed by Zero and his students; John proceeds to kill all but two. Zero battles John but is eventually defeated and left to die. On the roof of the Continental, The Adjudicator agrees to a parley with Winston, who offers fealty to the High Table.

John arrives; Winston shoots him and John falls to the street below. Winston reassumes his position and the severely injured John is secretly delivered to the Bowery King in an underground bunker; the two agree to join forces against the High Table.

Cast

 Keanu Reeves as Jardani Jovanovich / John Wick, a former assassin on the run from the High Table.
 Halle Berry as Sofia Al-Azwar, an ex-assassin, a former friend of John, and the manager of the Continental Hotel in Casablanca.
 Laurence Fishburne as "The Bowery King"
 Mark Dacascos as Zero
 Asia Kate Dillon as "The Adjudicator"
 Lance Reddick as Charon, the concierge at the Continental Hotel in New York.
 Anjelica Huston as "The Director"
 Ian McShane as Winston Scott

 Tobias Segal portrays Earl
 Saïd Taghmaoui as "The Elder"
 Jerome Flynn as Berrada
 Randall Duk Kim as "The Doctor"
 Margaret Daly as Operator
 Robin Lord Taylor as "Administrator"
 Susan Blommaert as "Librarian"
 Jason Mantzoukas as "Tick Tock Man", one of the Bowery King's men
 Cecep Arif Rahman as Shinobi #1, one of Zero's pupils
 Yayan Ruhian as Shinobi #2, another of Zero's pupils
 Unity Phelan as Rooney, a ballerina training to become an assassin.
 Roger Yuan as Huang, a Triad gang assassin (uncredited)
 Tiger Chen as Triad (uncredited)
 Boban Marjanović as Ernest

Production

In October 2016, Chad Stahelski, who made his directorial debut with John Wick and served as Reeves' Matrix stunt double, stated that a third film in the John Wick series was in the works, and in June 2017, it was reported that Derek Kolstad, who wrote the two prior films, would return to write the screenplay. In January 2018, it was reported that Stahelski would return to direct.

According to Reeves, the film's title was taken from the famous 4th-century Roman military quote "Si vis pacem, para bellum", which means, "If you want peace, prepare for war." In an interview with The New York Times, McShane said that the film would be big, good, and that nothing is the same while also hinting that part of the action could be the High Table's payback not only on Wick but also on his close friend Winston.

Casting
In January 2018, it was reported that Hiroyuki Sanada was in talks to join the cast. Later, it was revealed that Ian McShane, Laurence Fishburne, and Lance Reddick would reprise their roles from previous John Wick films. In May 2018, Halle Berry, Anjelica Huston, Asia Kate Dillon, Mark Dacascos, Jason Mantzoukas, Yayan Ruhian, Cecep Arif Rahman, and Tiger Chen joined the cast. In November 2018, Said Taghmaoui confirmed his involvement in the film.

Filming
Principal photography began May 5, 2018, in New York City, along with additional filming locations in Casablanca. Principal photography lasted until November 17, 2018. Cinematographer Dan Laustsen was asked about how challenging it was to use as many extended fight scene takes as possible while filming the high action screenplay. He stated, "Of course it is [a challenge], because all the fights—Chad [Stahelski] is doing most of the fights himself. We play that as wide as we can. Because that way we see it's him. We do that a lot, we try to play it as wide as we can and do long shots. Of course, because Chad has a background from the stunt world he knows exactly how to block this kind of stuff. I'm not the best stunt person in the world, but I'm learning." In an interview with Jimmy Fallon, Halle Berry said, "I broke three ribs in rehearsal."

The action scene with a hitman named Earnest, played by NBA basketball player Boban Marjanović, was inspired by the Bruce Lee film Game of Death (1972), where Lee fights NBA basketball player Kareem Abdul-Jabbar.  Unlike most of the other stunt scenes, Earnest has a few lines bantering with John Wick, but he still loses.

Special effects
The visual effects are provided by Method Studios, Image Engine, and Soho VFX.

Music

Tyler Bates and Joel J. Richard return to score the film. The soundtrack was released by Varèse Sarabande.

The theme song for the film is "Bullet Holes" by English rock band Bush. While Tyler Bates was writing music with the band, he decided that the song would be perfect for the film, and sent it to Chad Stahelski. Also featured is the song "Ninja Re Bang Bang" by Japanese artist Kyary Pamyu Pamyu.

Marketing
The studio spent an estimated $48 million on prints and advertisements promoting the film.

Release

Theatrical
Parabellum premiered in Brooklyn, New York on May 9, 2019. The film was theatrically released in the United States on May 17, 2019, by Lionsgate.

Home media
The film was released on Digital HD on August 23, 2019, and was released on DVD, Blu-ray, and Ultra HD Blu-ray on September 10, 2019, by Lionsgate Home Entertainment.

Reception

Box office
John Wick: Chapter 3 – Parabellum grossed $171 million in the United States and Canada, and $155.7 million in other territories, for a worldwide total of $326.7 million. Deadline Hollywood calculated the net profit of the film to be $89million, when factoring together all expenses and revenues.

In the United States and Canada, Parabellum was released alongside A Dog's Journey and The Sun Is Also a Star and was initially projected to gross $30–40 million from 3,850 theaters in its opening weekend. The film made $5.9 million from Thursday night previews, more than the total of the Thursday night previews for the previous two films ($950,000 and $2.2 million). It then made $22.7 million on its first day (including previews), increasing its projected gross to $56 million. It went on to debut at $57 million, becoming the first film to dethrone Avengers: Endgame atop the box office. It was the best opening of the series, and more than the first film made during its entire theatrical run ($43 million). In its second weekend the film made $24.4 million, finishing second behind newcomer Aladdin. It then earned $11.1 million in its third weekend and $6.4 million in its fourth.

Critical response
The website's critical consensus reads, "John Wick: Chapter 3 – Parabellum reloads for another hard-hitting round of the brilliantly choreographed, over-the-top action that fans of the franchise demand." On Metacritic, the film has a weighted average score of 73 out of 100, based on 50 critics, indicating "generally favorable reviews". Audiences polled by CinemaScore gave the film an average grade of "A−" on an A+ to F scale, the same as its predecessor, while those at PostTrak gave it 4.5 out of 5 stars and a "definite recommend" of 75%. Rotten Tomatoes also ranked it at No. 2 on its list of "The Best Action Movies of 2019".

Peter Sobczynski of RogerEbert.com gave the film 4 out of 4 stars, calling it "a work of pop cinema so blissfully, albeit brutally, entertaining that you come out of it feeling even more resentful of its multiplex neighbors for not making a similar effort." Chris Nashawaty of Entertainment Weekly gave the film a grade of "A−", writing that "as gorgeously choreographed, gratuitously violent action movies go, it's high art". Wendy Ide of The Observer gave the film 4 out of 5 stars, calling it "a flying kick to the senses" and writing that "The spectacular third installment in Keanu Reeves's fighting franchise overwhelms with opulent martial arts set pieces".

Accolades

Follow-ups

Sequel

On May 20, 2019, following the third film's successful debut, John Wick: Chapter 4 was announced and given a May 21, 2021 release date. This film was planned to be released alongside The Matrix Resurrections, also starring Keanu Reeves. However, on May 1, 2020, the film was delayed to March 24, 2023, due to the COVID-19 pandemic.

Spin-off

In October 2018, Lionsgate Films acquired Shay Hatten's action thriller Ballerina, with Thunder Road Films producing the film with Hatten rewriting the script to be a part of the John Wick franchise, for which the proof-of-concept short film pitch, described as "female John Wick" was previously uploaded to YouTube in September 2017, with the film's intended protagonist, a tattooed ballerina and would-be assassin named Rooney, making her cinematic debut in Parabellum, portrayed by Unity Phelan. In October 2019, Len Wiseman was hired to direct the film. In October 2021, Ana de Armas entered talks to star in the lead role, replacing Phelan. On November 7, 2022, principal photography on the film, starring de Armas, began in Prague, with Ian McShane and Keanu Reeves announced to be reprising their respective roles from previous films the following day.

Notes

References

External links

 
 
 
 

3
Films directed by Chad Stahelski
2019 action thriller films
Gun fu films
2019 films
American action thriller films
American neo-noir films
American sequel films
Films about secret societies
Films with screenplays by Derek Kolstad
Films scored by Tyler Bates
Films set in Casablanca
Films set in New York City
Films with screenplays by Shay Hatten
Summit Entertainment films
Films produced by Basil Iwanyk
Thunder Road Films films
Lionsgate films
Films shot in Morocco
2010s English-language films
2010s American films